Barrel Full of Monkees is a compilation album of songs by the Monkees, released by Colgems Records in 1971. The double album was produced and marketed for children, after the success of the Monkees' television show being rebroadcast on Saturday mornings by CBS, and was the last LP ever issued by Colgems.

Despite being issued by Colgems, the album was part of a mid-priced RCA 2-LP series called the "This Is..." series. Popular RCA artists such as Chet Atkins, Harry Belafonte and Perry Como had discs in the series and the RCA LP releases carried a VPS prefix and listed for $5.98, which was the list price for "full line" single LP records at the time. The Monkees' double set also listed for $5.98 and carried a then-new "SCOS" prefix and new numbering series, "1001," making it unrelated to any other previous Colgems issue or pricing series.

The 20-song collection included 13 of the 14 tracks found on The Monkees' first Greatest Hits compilation, the missing exception being "Zor and Zam."

After the closing of Colgems in 1971, Barrel Full of Monkees was deleted, with the next Monkees compilation, Re-Focus, being issued by Colgems' successor, Bell Records.

Track listing

Side 1

Side 2

Side 3

Side 4

References

The Monkees compilation albums
1971 compilation albums
Colgems Records compilation albums